Breton Brother and Sister is a mid 19th-century painting by French artist William Bouguereau. Done in oil on canvas, the painting depicts a Breton brother and sister in traditional costume. The work - though created in 1871 - was created on the basis of sketches Bouguereau made in the late 1860s while vacationing in Brittany. The work is in the collection of the Metropolitan Museum of Art.

References 

1871 paintings
Paintings in the collection of the Metropolitan Museum of Art
Paintings by William-Adolphe Bouguereau